RTV Bugojno or Televizija Bugojno is a local Bosnian  public television channel based in city of Bugojno. It was established as Radio televizija Bugojno in 1992 when local municipal Radio Bugojno started television broadcasting.

RTV Bugojno broadcasts a variety of programs such as local news and documentaries. Program is mainly produced in Bosnian language. The program also consists of the syndicated program content from television network called Program Plus.

Radio Bugojno is also part of public municipality services.

References

External links 
 Official website of RTV Bugojno
 Website of CRA BiH

Television channels and stations established in 1992
Television stations in Bosnia and Herzegovina